Katsuk Glacier is in North Cascades National Park in the U.S. state of Washington, in a cirque to the north of Katsuk Peak and east of Kimtah Peak. Both Katsuk and Kimtah Peaks are prominent summits along a ridge known as Jagged Edge. Kimtah Glacier is immediately west of Katsuk Glacier, while the Mesahchie Glacier lies to the east.

See also
List of glaciers in the United States

References

Glaciers of the North Cascades
Glaciers of Skagit County, Washington
Glaciers of Washington (state)